"The Girlfriend Song" is the second and final single by the Australian rock band Tlot Tlot. The single was released in 1995 and was nominated for the ARIA award for Best Pop Release.

At the ARIA Music Awards of 1995, the song was nominated for ARIA Award for Best Pop Release.

Composition 
The song is a mid-tempo pop rock song. Its lyrics are about the singer's girlfriend. The chord progression is F-A#-D#-A#.

Music video 
The video is set in a white room and begins with a shot of some cables and effects pedals, before cutting to Paulzen singing the intro and playing guitar. Bolwell then starts singing while a crazed woman tries to hug him. In some shots, Bolwell can be seen wearing a hammer and sickle shirt. The end of the video shows Bolwell and Paulzen jumping around, with Bolwell holding a guitar.

Track listing 

Track 2 was previously released on the album Fashion Takes a Holiday.

Personnel
 Stanley Paulzen - guitars, drums, lead vocals (track4)
 Owen Bolwell - bass, keyboards, lead vocals (tracks 1–3), megaphone (track 2), CD machine operator (track 4)
 George Siew Ooi - producer

Charts

References

External links 
 The Girlfriend Song at Discogs

1995 singles
Tlot Tlot songs
1995 songs
EMI Records singles